The Special Greeting for Chris' Birthday is the debut EP by Chinese singer Li Yuchun, released on March 10, 2006 by Taihe Rye.

Track listing

Music videos
Happy Winter

References 

2006 EPs
Li Yuchun albums
Mandopop EPs